Mark G. Lebwohl, M.D., is an American dermatologist and author and the Waldman Professor and Chairman of the Kimberly and Eric J. Waldman Department of and Chairman of the Department of Dermatology at the Mount Sinai Hospital in New York City.

Lebwohl's books include the book on dermatologic therapy, Treatment of Skin Disease, as well as Atlas of the Skin and Systemic Disease. He has authored more than 500 publications, multiple book chapters and has been named as one of New York Magazine’s “Best Doctors” every year since the inception of the annual list. Dr. Brian S. Kim is director of a Center for Neuroinflammation and Sensation named in Mark Lebwohl’s honor at Icahn School of Medicine at Mount Sinai.

Biography

Education 
Lebwohl graduated from Columbia University in 1974. He earned his medical degree from Harvard Medical School in 1978 and subsequently completed residencies in both internal medicine and dermatology at the Icahn School of Medicine at Mount Sinai.

Career 
In 1983, he was made Assistant Professor of Dermatology at Mount Sinai. In 1997, he was named Chairman of the Department which, under his leadership, has been at the forefront of the management of psoriasis.

Lebwohl was the first to report the cardiac complications of pseudoxanthoma elasticum, and, additionally, he has developed new techniques for diagnosing the disease. He was also the first to use immunomodulators (imiquimod) to treat precancerous skin lesions; the first to use topical calcineurin inhibitors to treat psoriasis; and the first to identify interactions between topical vitamin D analogues such as calcipotriol and calcitriol with other topical medications and with ultraviolet light.

Memberships 
Lebwohl has served as president of the New York Dermatological Society, the Manhattan Dermatologic Society, and the New York State Society of Dermatology, and as chairman of the Dermatology Section of the New York Academy of Medicine. He served as chairman of the National Psoriasis Foundation's medical board chairman of the Psoriasis Task Force of the American Academy of Dermatology (AAD) and was a member of the Scientific Assembly Council. He chaired the Academy’s summer meeting in 2001 in California and the AAD annual meeting in Washington, D.C. in 2004. He was elected to the Board of Directors of the AAD for 2010-2014. In 2020, he was elected to the board of the American Skin Association.

Awards and honors
Lebwohl earned Presidential Citations in 2002, 2005 and 2006 from the American Academy of Dermatology. Additional awards include:
1993 Founder’s Award, National Psoriasis Foundation
2001 PXE International Award
2003 The Jacobi medallion, Mount Sinai Medical Center
2003 British Medical Association Medical Books Competition
Highly commended electronic media award for Treatment of Skin Disease, PDA version.
2005 Distinguished Service Award, American Dermatological Association
2006 Winner, The Society of Authors and the Royal Society of Medicine Book Awards for New Edition of an Edited Book, Treatment of Skin Disease: Comprehensive Therapeutic Strategies (2nd edition)

Publications

Journals 
Lebwohl is on the editorial board of the Journal of the American Academy of Dermatology and was the editor of the Dermatology Section of Scientific American Medicine, now called ACP Medicine. He is a founding editor of Psoriasis Forum and was medical editor of the bulletin of the National Psoriasis Foundation, Psoriasis Advance.

Books 

Lebwohl M, Heymann WR, Berth-Jones J, Coulson I, editors. Treatment of Skin Disease, 3rd edition (2010). London, Mosby 2nd edition (2006) 1st edition (2002) Also published in electronic versions and in Polish and Portuguese. 
Koo, JM, Lebwohl, MG, Lee, CS. (Eds.). (2009). Moderate-to-Severe Psoriasis. New York: Informa Healthcare. 
Koo JM, Lebwohl MG, Lee CS, editors. Mild-to-Moderate Psoriasis 2nd edition(2008). New York, Informa Healthcare  1st edition (2006) 
Lebwohl MG. The Skin and Systemic Disease: A Color Atlas and Text, 2nd edition (2004). New York, Churchill Livingstone  Also published in French. 
Lebwohl M. Atlas of the Skin and Systemic Disease (1995). New York, Churchill Livingstone 
Lebwohl M, editor. Difficult Diagnoses in Dermatology (1988). New York, Churchill Livingston 
Lebwohl M, author, treatment of Skin Disease: Comprehensive Therapeutic Strategies (2013), Saunders; 4 edition,

Publications
Partial list:

References

External links
The Mount Sinai Hospital homepage
Icahn School of Medicine at Mount Sinai homepage
Psoriasis Information at Mount Sinai
Psoriasis: Routes to Relief with Dr. Mark Lebwohl. WebMD Live Events Transcript
New & Effective Psoriasis Drug. Interview transcript: Dr. Mark Lebwohl discusses Stelara with The Saturday Evening Post

American dermatologists
Columbia University alumni
Living people
Icahn School of Medicine at Mount Sinai faculty
Harvard Medical School alumni
Year of birth missing (living people)